The 2014 Crawley Borough Council election took place on 22 May 2014 to elect members of Crawley Borough Council in West Sussex, England. This was on the same day as other local elections.

One third of the council was up for election and the Labour Party gained control of the council.

After the election, the composition of the council was:
Labour 20 (+4)
Conservative 16 (-4)
United Kingdom Independence Party 1

Ward results

Bewbush

Broadfield North

Broadfield South

Furnace Green

Ifield

Langley Green

Maidenbower

Northgate

Pound Hill North

Pound Hill South and Worth

Southgate

West Green

References

2014 English local elections
2014
2010s in West Sussex